The Chinese Exclusion Act is a 2017 documentary film about the United States Chinese Exclusion Act of 1882. Produced by PBS as a "special presentation" for the American Experience documentary program, it explores how the Act's 61-year-long prohibition of Chinese immigrants to the United States had an effect on Chinese communities already living in the country. Directed by Ric Burns and Li-Shin Yu, who also served as writer and editor respectively, the film premiered in the 2017 CAAMFest and aired on PBS in the United States on May 29, 2018.

Interviewees
Martin B. Gold, attorney
Erika Lee, historian
David Lei, community advocate
Mary Ting Yi Lui, historian
Mae Ngai, historian
Jean Pfaelzer, historian
Kevin Starr, historian
John Kuo Wei Tchen, historian
Ling-chi Wang, scholar
K. Scott Wong, historian
Renqiu Yu, historian

Production
The documentary began production in 2012.

Critical response
Mike Hale of The New York Times commended The Chinese Exclusion Act for its timeliness and stated that it serves as "a cautionary tale" for immigration in the United States, though he noted that the complex history recounted in the film "takes some focus on the viewer’s part to keep the thread." Hanh Nguyen of IndieWire gave the film a "B+", praising it as "sobering and eye-opening" and singling out its interviewees' enlightening commentary as the film's "real value".

Home media
The Chinese Exclusion Act was released on DVD by PBS on June 19, 2018.

References

External links
PBS official site

2017 films
2017 documentary films
American Experience
Films about Chinese Americans
Documentary films about Asian Americans
Documentary films about law in the United States
Documentary films about racism in the United States
Films directed by Ric Burns
2010s English-language films